Timur Askaruly Kulibayev (born 10 September 1966) is a Kazakh business oligarch and son-in-law of former Kazakh president Nursultan Nazarbayev. Kulibayev has held several positions in important state-owned enterprises that manage Kazakhstan's natural resources, and has immense influence over the country's hydrocarbon industry. He is the former Chairman of the Management Board of Samruk-Kazyna National Welfare Fund and a member of the Board of Directors of the Gazprom company from 2011 to 2022. , he had an estimated net worth of $3.7billion. Kulibayev has been called "the most important business figure in the resource-rich" Republic of Kazakhstan by The Daily Telegraph.

In 2020, a Financial Times investigative report revealed that Kulibayev was involved in schemes to skim profits from state contracts for pipeline construction. Due to 2022 Kazakh unrest, he and his wife Dinara lost $200million after Halyk Bank fell 16% at the London Stock Exchange.

Early life and education
Kulibayev was born on 10 September 1966 in Alma-Ata (now Almaty), Kazakh SSR, USSR. In 1988, he graduated from Lomonosov Moscow State University after studying "National Economy Planning".

Business career
From 1988 to 1992, he was a junior research assistant at the Scientific-Research Economics Institute of Planning and Normative Standards (SREIP&NS) under the State Plan of Kazakh Soviet Socialist Republic, and was a director of the Scientific-Consulting Center of the Fund of Cultural, Social, Scientific and Technological Development of Kazakhstan.

The election of T.A. Kulibayev to the Board of Directors of the Russian largest energy company shows the particular importance of economic cooperation between Kazakhstan and the Russian Federation, as well as a recognition of high professional qualities of the Chief Executive of Samruk-Kazyna Fund.

On 26 December 2011, Kulibayev resigned from the post of Chairman of the Board of Samruk-Kazyna.

Kulibayev joined the board of Gazprom in 2011. In March 2022, he resigned from Gazprom's board with immediate effect.

Since June 2008, he has been Chairman of the Kazakhstan National Committee of the World Petroleum Council.

In 2020, the Financial Times reported on emails and whistleblower information which showed that staff for Kulibayev was involved in schemes that would allow Kuilibayev to skim at least tens of millions of dollars from contracts that the Kazakhstani state made on pipeline construction.

Personal life 
Kulibayev is married to Dinara Nursultanovna (née Nazarbayeva), daughter of Kazakhstan's long-time president Nursultan Nazarbayev who is extremely close to Vladimir Putin. She and Kulibayev have three children. Kulibayev also has two children with entrepreneur and socialite Goga Ashkenazi.

In 2007, Kulibayev (with the help of Kazakhstani investor Kenes Rakishev) became the owner of Sunninghill Park, a country house formerly belonging to Prince Andrew, after Fergie and their daughters left the property in 2006. Kulibayev paid $19.7million for the house, $4million over the asking price, even though there were no other bids. In 2016 it was demolished and a 14-bedroom mansion was built in its place.

Kulibayev is an avid fan of sports, especially golf. He is a president of Kazakhstani Boxing Federation.

References

1966 births
Dughlats
Living people
Kazakhstani businesspeople
Ethnic Kazakh people
Recipients of the Order of Kurmet
Moscow State University alumni
Kazakhstani billionaires
Nursultan Nazarbayev family